The Doncaster District Football Club is a semi-professional Australian rules football club in the eastern suburbs of Melbourne. The club participates in the Eastern Football League.

History

Formed in 1902 the club joined the Reporter District Football Association in 1909. Success didn't come until the late 1920s when they won four premiers in five years.

Doncaster was one of the founding clubs of the Eastern Districts Football League in 1962, this league came about be the transfer of clubs from the Croydon-Ferntree Gully Football League and the Eastern Suburbs.

Senior Premierships

 Reporter District Football Association – 1909 to 1926
 Ringwood District Football Association – 1927 to 1937
 1927 – Doncaster 8-13-61 d Blackburn 5- 8-38
 1928 – Doncaster d Blackburn (won on protest, Blackburn played suspended player.)
 1929 – Doncaster 13-10- 88 d Mitcham 11-11-77
 1931 – Doncaster 20-14-134 d Ringwood 13-14-92
 1936 – Doncaster 15-15-105 d Ringwood 11-21-87
 Eastern Suburbs Football League – 1938 to 1961
 1939 – Doncaster 14-14-98 d Mitcham 14-10-94
 Eastern Football League – 1962 onwards
 1972 – Doncaster 17-15-117 d Bayswater 11-14-80    
 1984 – Doncaster 11-21-87 d Boronia 8-5-53
 1990 – Doncaster 17-11-113 d Mooroolbark 10-9-69
 1996 – Doncaster 16- 5-101 d Templestowe 6- 7-43
 2011 – Doncaster 14-19-103 d North Ringwood 5-8-38
 2013 – Doncaster 25-11-161 d Wantirna South 15-12-102

References

External links
 Official website

Eastern Football League (Australia) clubs
Australian rules football clubs in Melbourne
1902 establishments in Australia
Australian rules football clubs established in 1902
Sport in the City of Manningham